Sminthurus is a genus of springtails described by Pierre André Latreille in 1802.

Species
These 31 species belong to the genus Sminthurus:

 Sminthurus adirondackus Maynard, 1951 i c g
 Sminthurus anomalus Betsch, 1965 i c g
 Sminthurus aquaticus Bourlet, 1842 g
 Sminthurus argenteornatus Banks, 1899 i c g
 Sminthurus banksi Christiansen and Bellinger, 1981 i c g
 Sminthurus bivittatus Snider, RJ, 1985 b
 Sminthurus bourgeoisi Nayrolles, 1995 g
 Sminthurus bozoulensis Nayrolles, 1995 g
 Sminthurus butcheri Snider, 1969 i c g b
 Sminthurus carolinensis Snider, RJ, 1981 b
 Sminthurus coeruleus Strebel, 1938 g
 Sminthurus eiseni Schott, 1891 i c g
 Sminthurus fischeri Snider, RJ, 1982 b
 Sminthurus fitchi Folsom, 1896 i c g b
 Sminthurus floridanus MacGillivray, 1893 i c g
 Sminthurus hispanicus Nayrolles, 1995 g
 Sminthurus hortensis Fitch, 1863 g
 Sminthurus incisus Snider, 1978 i c g b
 Sminthurus leucomelanus Nayrolles, 1995 g
 Sminthurus maculatus Tomosvary, 1883 g
 Sminthurus medialis Mills, 1934 i c g b
 Sminthurus mencenbergae Snider, RJ, 1983 b
 Sminthurus multipunctatus Schäffer, 1896 g
 Sminthurus nigrinus Bretfeld, 2000 g
 Sminthurus nigromaculatus Tullberg, 1871 g
 Sminthurus packardi Folsom, 1896 i c g
 Sminthurus purpurescens (Macgillivray, 1894) i c g
 Sminthurus schoetti Salmon, 1964 i c g
 Sminthurus sylvestris Banks, 1899 i c g
 Sminthurus viridis (Linnaeus, 1758) i c g
 Sminthurus wahlgreni Stach, 1920 g

Data sources: i = ITIS, c = Catalogue of Life, g = GBIF, b = BugGuide

References

Springtail genera